Derrick Tseng (born 1954) is an American independent film producer based in New York City. Following graduate work in literature and a brief career as a writer and editor in school book publishing, he transitioned to film, first as a lighting technician, then as a line producer and first assistant director. In the 1990s, he moved up the ranks of the New York independent film world, eventually establishing himself as a producer. Since 2001, Tseng has been a frequent collaborator of filmmakers David Gordon Green (All the Real Girls, Snow Angels, Prince Avalanche, Joe, Manglehorn) and Todd Solondz (Palindromes, Life During Wartime, Dark Horse, Wiener-Dog).

Filmography 
 The Evening Hour (2020)
 Cunningham (2019)
 Brian Banks (2018)
Then Came You (2018)
 An Actor Prepares (2018)
 Wiener-Dog (2016)
 Manglehorn (2015)
 Red Oaks (2014)
 Revenge of the Green Dragons (2014)
 Joe (2014)
 Prince Avalanche (2013)
Dark Horse on IMDB (2011)
Almost Perfect on IMDB (2010)
Fighting Fish on IMDB (2010)
Life During Wartime on IMDB (2009)
Henry May Long on IMDB (2008)
Choke (2008)
The Ten (2007)
Snow Angels (2007)
 Stella (2005)
Lonesome Jim (2005)
Tanner on Tanner (2004)
Palindromes (2004)
All the Real Girls (2003)
Party Monster (2003)
Maryam (2002)
Face (2002)
Tart (2001)
The Business of Strangers (2001)Super Troopers (2001)Signs & Wonders (2000)Happy Accidents (2000)Cry Baby Lane (2000)Freak Talks About Sex (1999)
Cross Words on IMDB (1999)
Vig on IMDB (1998)
Stag on IMDB (1997)
Under the Bridge on IMDB (1997)Chasing Amy (1997)
 Grind (1996)
Sudden Manhattan on IMDB (1996)
 Palookaville'' (1995)

References

External links 

American film producers
Living people
1954 births